The 2009–10 Celtic League Grand Final was the final match of the 2009–10 Celtic League season. The 2009–10 season was the fourth sponsored by Magners and was the first ever Celtic League Grand Final.
The final was won by the Ospreys who defeated Leinster by 17–12 at the RDS Arena to win their third Celtic League title, the win ended Leinster's 20-month unbeaten home league record.

Route to the final

2009–10 Final Table
{| class="wikitable"
|+ Key to colours
|-
|bgcolor=#d8ffeb|    
| Top four teams advance to playoffs.
|}

2010 Playoffs

Semi-finals

Match

Summary
First-half Ospreys tries from Tommy Bowe after 20 minutes and Lee Byrne after 35 minutes which were both converted put the Ospreys 14–3 up at half time, with the Leinster score coming from a Johnny Sexton penalty after 23 minutes. A further penalty from Sexton brought the score to 14–6 before Dan Biggar kicked over a penalty for the Ospreys after 48 minutes. Two more penalties from Sexton in the 62nd and 71st minutes made the score 17–12, but that was enough for the Ospreys to hold and become the first side to win the title for the third time.

Details

Reaction
Ospreys head coach Sean Holley reacted to the win saying  "it's a special night, I wouldn't say it was our best performance, but certainly one of our most courageous and determined." "Leinster are pretty outstanding in defence, and it's the end of a long, hard season, I'm not that surprised (we cut through them), because we have some great talent."
Departing Leinster coach Michael Cheika reacted to the loss by saying "Ospreys deserved the win but we're disappointed with ourselves. We didn't play well, we tried to fight our way back into the game, but we made too many mistakes. We probably just weren't accurate in the defensive section or where we needed to be in the team."

References

External links
2010 Celtic League Grand Final Coverage at ESPN

2009–10 Celtic League
2009–10 in Irish rugby union
2009–10 in Welsh rugby union
2010 Grand Final
Leinster Rugby matches
Ospreys (rugby union) matches
Celtic League